The Gregangelo Museum is a work of installation art located in a Mediterranean-style house originally built in the early 1920s in the St. Francis Wood district of San Francisco. The house was converted into an art project during the 1980s. Though most of the twenty-seven rooms in the house  have been significantly remodeled, the original 1920s architecture was intentionally salvaged. The founder, Gregangelo Herrera, owns Gregangelo’s Velocity Circus/Arts and Entertainment, a circus troupe and arts and entertainment company which uses the Gregangelo Museum as a company headquarters. The Gregangelo Museum has been cited in interior design books, television networks, and editorial pages such as The Bold Italic and the San Francisco Chronicle. In 2012, The Gregangelo Museum was dubbed one of a few "Home Strange Homes" by HGTV and has since featured on Voltage TV's "World's Weirdest Homes"  and Netflix's Amazing Interiors. The Gregangelo Museum was also recently featured in The Mercury News as one of the “12 coolest bay area things you didn’t know you could do”  as well as being included in “Secret San Francisco: A Guide to the Weird, the Wonderful, and the Obscure."

Egyptian and Middle Eastern themed installations, mosaics, and paintings are some of the main features of the museum. The Gregangelo Museum generates its revenue by offering tours of the home to the general public. The tour starts outside of the house and gradually makes its way through the themed rooms and up onto the second floor. The second floor is a hidden second half of the museum called The Labyrinth, which is a series of maze-like crawl spaces that lead to more themed rooms.

The Gregangelo Museum is a storyboard to the Velocity Circus shows. Each room is described as an entirely different universe by those who visit the home. Each room is also called a "portal," resonating for many as a sort of C. S. Lewis novel reanimated. The philosophy of the house follows that each portal will bring visitors into a different existence, universe, and head-space. The house invites existentialism and as one blogger wrote, "Gregangelo wished the secrets of the universe could be revealed."

The Gregangelo Museum's mosaic was described by JoAnn Lockvot as "unprecedented and untraditional." The house's decor mixes the humorous with the spiritual. Artist True made most of the mosaic in the house, a mix of the bubbles, swirling galaxies, and colorful particles. Gregangelo Herrera uses the projects in the house to employ Velocity Circus artists when they are not training for a show. The purpose of the house is not to be viewed as a finished product, but as a reflection of the artists' ongoing journey.

References

Houses in San Francisco
Installation art works